Sergei Vladimirovich Markin (born 14 May 1966) is a Russian football coach and a former player.

References

1966 births
Living people
Soviet footballers
FK Köpetdag Aşgabat players
Russian footballers
Russian expatriate footballers
Expatriate footballers in Hungary
FC Tyumen players
Russian Premier League players
FC Okean Nakhodka players
Mohun Bagan AC players
Expatriate footballers in India
Happy Valley AA players
Expatriate footballers in Hong Kong
Shenzhen F.C. players
Expatriate footballers in China
Expatriate footballers in Finland
Association football defenders